That Woman Opposite (U.S. City After Midnight) is a 1957 British crime drama, directed by Compton Bennett and starring Phyllis Kirk, Dan O'Herlihy and William Franklyn.  The screenplay, also by Bennett, was adapted from John Dickson Carr's 1942 novel The Emperor's Snuff-Box.

The film was generally positively received by critics, with Picturegoer commenting: "At last, a British thriller with class...here's a gloss that usually comes with an import label".  In a more measured but still approving critique, a Radio Times reviewer said: "Don't expect too much of this modest film...and you'll be agreeably entertained by an efficiently directed work graced by many recognisable faces".

Plot
In a town on the French coast, English antiques dealer Maurice Lawes (Wilfrid Hyde-White) is a witness to the night-time murder of a gendarme.  The killer spots Lawes at his window, and realises he has been seen.  The following evening, Lawes' daughter Janice (Petula Clark) finds her father also murdered.

An investigation is launched by the local police and a private insurance investigator Dermot Kinross (O'Herlihy).  The initial assumption – that Lawes was murdered by the gendarme's killer to prevent identification – soon comes into question as several other individuals connected to Lawes are revealed to have plausible motives for the murder.

Lawes' son Toby (Jack Watling) is found to have been embezzling funds from his father to pay off a blackmailing ex-mistress; Toby's fiancée Eve (Kirk), living directly opposite the murder scene, is investigated and found to have in her possession bloodstained clothing which she cannot satisfactorily explain away. Eve's ex-husband Ned (Franklyn) turns out to have a particular interest in a rare snuffbox from Lawes' personal collection which is discovered to be missing, and may have killed Lawes when disturbed in the process of burglary.

Eve comes under particular scrutiny as it is considered she could have been an accomplice of either Toby or Ned.  It falls to Kinross to unravel the actual chain of events and arrive at the correct solution.

Cast
 Phyllis Kirk as Eve Atwood
 Dan O'Herlihy as Dermot Kinross
 William Franklyn as Ned Atwood
 Jack Watling as Toby Lawes
 Wilfrid Hyde-White as Sir Maurice Lawes
 Petula Clark as Janice Lawes
 Guido Lorraine as Aristide Goron
 Margaret Withers as Lady Helena Lawes
 Tita Dane as Marie Latour
 Robert Raikes as Bill
 André Charisse as Gaston
 Jacques Cey as Busson
 Irene Moore as Diana

References

External links 
 
 

1957 films
1957 crime films
Films directed by Compton Bennett
1950s English-language films
British black-and-white films
Films set in France
Films based on American novels
British crime films
1950s British films